Andriy Mykhaylovych Veresotskyi (born 21 January 1992) is a Ukrainian professional footballer who plays as a defender for FC Chernihiv in the Ukrainian Second League.

Early and amateur career
Veresotskyi started his career in the youth setup of Desna Chernihiv. In 2011 he played for FC Yednist' Plysky. In 2012 he moved to LKT Chernihiv, where he helped to side to the semifinals of the 2012 Ukrainian Amateur Cup. He then moved to FC Frunzivets Nizhyn and Avangard Korukivka.

Career

FC Chernihiv
In summer 2020 he moved to FC Chernihiv in the Ukrainian Second League. On 6 September he made his debut for the club in a 2–0 victory over Rubikon Kyiv. On 18 August 2021 he appeared in the 2021–22 Ukrainian Cup the Second preliminary round against Chaika Petropavlivska Borshchahivka, helping his team qualify for the third preliminary round for the first time in club history. On 30 October 2022, he played his first match in Ukrainian First League against Obolon Kyiv replacing Vitaly Mentey at the 75th minutes.

Career statistics

Club

Honours
FC Chernihiv
 Chernihiv Oblast Football Championship: 2018, 2019

FC Frunzivets Nizhyn
 Chernihiv Oblast Football Championship: 2016

References

External links
 
 

1992 births
Living people
Ukrainian footballers
Association football defenders
SDYuShOR Desna players
FC Chernihiv players
FC Avanhard Koriukivka players
FC Kudrivka players
Ukrainian Second League players
Ukrainian First League players